Gold leaf is gold that has been hammered into thin sheets (usually around 0.1 µm thick) by goldbeating and is often used for gilding. Gold leaf is available in a wide variety of karats and shades. The most commonly used gold is 22-karat yellow gold.

Gold leaf is a type of metal leaf, but the term is rarely used when referring to gold leaf. The term metal leaf is normally used for thin sheets of metal of any color that do not contain any real gold. Pure gold is 24 karat. Real, yellow gold leaf is approximately 91.7% pure (i.e. 22-karat) gold. 

Layering gold leaf over a surface is called gold leafing or gilding. Traditional water gilding is the most difficult and highly regarded form of gold leafing. It has remained virtually unchanged for hundreds of years and is still done by hand.

In art
Gold leaf is sometimes used in art in a "raw" state, without a gilding process. In cultures including the European Bronze Age it was used to wrap objects such as bullae simply by folding it tightly over, and the Classical group of gold lunulae are so thin, especially in the centre, that they might be classed as gold leaf.  It has been used in jewellery in various periods, often as small pieces hanging freely.

Since the decline of gold ground painting at the end of the Middle Ages, gold leaf has been most popular and most common in its use as gilding material for decoration of art (including statues and Eastern Christian icons) or the picture frames that are often used to hold or decorate paintings, mixed media, small objects (including jewelry) and paper art. Gold glass is gold leaf held between two pieces of glass, and was used to decorate Ancient Roman vessels, where some of the gold was scraped off to form an image, as well as tesserae gold mosaics.  Gold-ground paintings, where the background of the figures was all in gold, was introduced in mosaics in later Early Christian art, and then used in icons and Western panel paintings until the late Middle Ages; all techniques use gold leaf. Gold leaf is also used in Buddhist art to decorate statues and symbols. Gold leafing can also be seen on domes in religious and public architecture. "Gold" frames made without leafing are also available for a considerably lower price, but traditionally some form of gold or metal leaf was preferred when possible and gold leafed (or silver leafed) moulding is still commonly available from many of the companies that produce commercially available moulding for use as picture frames.

Gold leaf is the basis of the gold ink used in Islamic calligraphy and Islamic manuscript illumination. The leaves are crushed in honey or gum arabic, then suspended in gelatinous water. Because the gold is not pulverized as in industrially produced metal inks, the resulting surface looks very much like solid gold.

In architecture

Gold leaf has long been an integral component of architecture to designate important structures, both for aesthetics and because gold's non-reactive nature provides a protective finish.

Gold in architecture became an integral component of Byzantine and Roman churches and basilicas in 400 AD, most notably Basilica di Santa Maria Maggiore in Rome. The church was built by Pope Sixtus III and is one of the earliest examples of gold mosaics. The mosaics were made of stone, tile or glass backed on gold leaf walls, giving the church a beautifully intricate backdrop. The Athenian marble columns supporting the nave are even older, and either come from the first basilica, or from another antique Roman building; thirty-six are marble and four granite, pared down, or shortened to make them identical  by Ferdinando Fuga, who provided them with identical gilt-bronze capitals. The 14th century campanile, or bell tower, is the highest in Rome, at 240 feet, (about 75 m.). The basilica's 16th-century coffered ceiling, designed by Giuliano da Sangallo, is said to be gilded with gold that Christopher Columbus presented to Ferdinand and Isabella, before being passed on to the Spanish pope, Alexander VI. The apse mosaic, the Coronation of the Virgin, is from 1295, signed by the Franciscan friar, Jacopo Torriti.

In Ottawa, Ontario, the Centre Block is the main building of the Canadian parliamentary complex on Parliament Hill, containing the House of Commons and Senate chambers, as well as the offices of a number of members of parliament, senators, and senior administration for both legislative houses. It is also the location of several ceremonial spaces, such as the Hall of Honour, the Memorial Chamber, and Confederation Hall. Capping the Senate chamber is a gilded ceiling with deep octagonal coffers, each filled with heraldic symbols, including maple leaves, fleur-de-lis, lions rampant, clàrsach, Welsh Dragons, and lions passant. This plane rests on six pairs and four single pilasters, each of which is capped by a caryatid, and between which are clerestory windows. Below the windows is a continuous architrave, broken only by baldachins at the base of each of the above pilasters.

In London, the Criterion Restaurant is an opulent building facing Piccadilly Circus in the heart of London. It was built by architect Thomas Verity in Neo-Byzantine style for the partnership Spiers and Pond who opened it in 1873. One of the restaurant’s most famous features is the 'glistering' ceiling of gold mosaic, coved at the sides and patterned all over with lines and ornaments in blue and white tesserae. The wall decoration accords well with the real yellow gold leaf ceiling, incorporating semi-precious stones such as jade, mother of pearl, turquoise being lined with warm marble and formed into blind arcades with semi-elliptical arches resting on slender octagonal columns, their unmolded capitals and the impost being encrusted with goldground mosaic

Gold leaf adorns the wrought iron gates surrounding the Palace of Versailles in France, when refinishing the gates nearly 200 years after they were torn down during the French Revolution, it required hundreds of kilograms of gold leaf to complete the process.

Culinary uses

Gold leaf (as well as other metal leaf such as vark) is sometimes used to decorate food or drink, typically to promote a perception of luxury and high value; however, it is flavorless. It is occasionally found in desserts and confectionery, including chocolates, honey and mithai. In India it may be used effectively as a garnish, with thin sheets placed on a main dish, especially on festive occasions. When used as an additive to food, gold has the E-number E175.  A centuries-old traditional artisan variety of green tea contains pieces of gold leaf; 99% of this kind of tea is produced in Kanazawa, Japan, a historic city for samurai craftsmanship.   The city is also home to a gold leaf museum, Kanazawa Yasue Gold Leaf Museum.

 
In Continental Europe liquors with tiny floating pieces of gold leaf are known of since the late 16th century; originally the practice was regarded as medicinal.  Well-known examples are Danziger Goldwasser, originally from Gdańsk, Poland, which has been produced since at least 1598, Goldstrike from Amsterdam, Goldwasser from Schwabach in Germany, and the Swiss Goldschläger, which is perhaps the best known in both Canada and the United States.

See also
Ormolu (aka bronze doré)
Dutch metal
Metallic dragée
Tin(IV) sulfide – a compound used to imitate gold

References

Visual arts materials
Food ingredients
Church architecture
Gilding
Gold